Cotagaita is a small town in Bolivia. In 2009 it had an estimated population of 1904.

Cotagaita (also: Santiago de Cotagaita) is a country town in the Potosí Department in Bolivia. The village was founded in 1570.

Location 
Cotagaita is central to the municipality of Cotagaita and capital of the province of Nor Chichas. Cotagaita lies at an altitude of 2640  meters on the Río Cotagaita, an inflow of the Rio Pilcomayo.

Geography 
Cotagaita is located in the southern part of the barren plateau of the Bolivian Altiplano. The climate is cool and dry due to the inland location and is characterized by a typical daytime climate, in which the temperature fluctuations between day and night are usually significantly larger than the seasonal fluctuations.

The average annual temperature is 15°C and varies only slightly between 11° C in June / July and 18° C in December and January. The annual rainfall is only about 300 mm, with a strong dry season from April to October with monthly rainfall below 10 mm, and a wet season from December to February with 70-80 mm monthly rainfall.

Transport network 
Cotagaita is 240 kilometers south of Potosí, the capital of the Potosí Department.

From Potosí, the road Route 1, which leads from Lake Titicaca in a southeasterly direction to the Argentine border, leads over 37 kilometers to Cuchu Ingenio . From there, Route 7 branches off to the south and reaches Vitoti and Tumusla after 203 kilometers to Cotagaita.

The city of Tupiza is about 83 kilometers further south . There are no paved traffic routes in the east-west direction.

Population 
The population of the village has increased by almost half in the past two decades:

The population of the region is mostly made up of the Quechua people, 96.1 percent of the inhabitants in the municipality of Cotagaita speak the Quechua language.

Natural disasters 
On February 6, 2020, heavy rainfall in the region resulted in catastrophic flooding from the river of the same name. Several hundred houses were destroyed and around a third of the population was affected.

References

Populated places in Potosí Department